Tomislav Bušić (born 2 February 1986) is a Croatian professional footballer who plays as a forward.

Club career

Early career
He also formerly played for Slaven Belupo and Hajduk Split with whom he won the Croatian League in 2005. In the summer of 2007, Bušić was loaned to Dynamo Kyiv for a one-year period but was back to his native club within six months. In June 2009 he was released by Hajduk Split after playing for the club for 5 years, and signed a three-year contract with Maccabi Petah Tikva F.C., playing in the Israeli premier league, in July 2009. After a season there, however, he returned to Croatia, signing with Slaven Belupo.

After leaving Simurq, Bušić signed for Druga HNL side Solin, before leaving for Albanian Superliga Vllaznia after only 11 days.

Vllaznia
Two days before the end of the summer transfer window, Bušić joined Vllaznia on a one-year contract.

Tirana
On 10 July 2014, Bušić became a player of Tirana by signing a one-year deal. He was chosen as the replacement of Gilberto, who did not find a way to extend his contract with the club. During first part of the season, he had two faces, because he was prolific in 2014–15 Albanian Cup while in 2014–15 Albanian Superliga managed to score once in 15 appearances. Bušić scored that goal on 14 October during a 2–1 win over Elbasani in Qemal Stafa Stadium.

T-Team
In July 2015, Bušić went to Malaysia and signed with T-Team of Malaysian Premier League. He enjoyed a prolific form there, scoring 13 goals in 16 appearances.

Flamurtari
Bušić returned to Albania after one year on 5 July 2016 by completing a transfer to Flamurtari as a free agent, rejoining his former Tirana boss Gugash Magani. He signed a one-year contract with a reported annual salary of €40,000. He made his competitive debut for the team on 7 September 2016 in the opening league match of 2016–17 season against Skënderbeu. His first score-sheet contributions came in his second appearance, netting the second goal of the match as Flamurtari outclassed Luftëtari by winning 5–0 at home. Busić made his first cup appearance of the 2016–17 season on 5 October in the second leg of first round against Iliria, scoring the opener as Flamurtari recorded a 6–0 home win, qualifying thus to the second round.

On 26 October, in the first leg of the second round, Bušić netted a last-minute equalizer as Flamurtari drew 3–3 away at Tërbuni. His second league goal came four days later, netting the third in the match against Korabi Peshkopi, returning Flamurtari to the winning ways in league after six matches. Busić was again decisive for his team where he netted a winner in Flamurtari 2–0 home defeat of Skënderbeu, giving the team its second consecutive league win and removing from the relegation zone.

Busić kicked off 2017 by playing in team's first match against Skënderbeu on 28 January, and scored his fourth league goal one week later in the 2–1 home win against Lufëtari. Five days later, he scored his first brace with Flamurtari, but nevertheless the team was defeated 3–2 by Vllaznia at Loro Boriçi Stadium. He finished his first season with the club by making 32 appearances, including 28 in league, scoring 12 goals, including 10 league goals, being the team top goalscorer, as Flamurtari avoided the relegation by just one point.

On 24 June 2017, Bušić agreed a contract extension, signing until June 2018. He opened his scoring account for the 2017–18 season on 16 September by netting in the 3–1 home win against newbie Lushnja. The next week, he captained Flamurtari for the first time and scored a brace to lead the team into a 3–1 win over Teuta. Bušić suffered a muscle injury on 19 November during the match versus Lushnja as was taken off before in the first half; despite injured, Bušić continue to play, appearing in the last 4 minutes in next match against Teuta and full-90 minutes at Luftëtari. Bušić strained himself by playing again versus Vllaznia Shkodër on 9 December but was replaced again after 21 minutes, thus being unable to play for the rest of 2017.

He made a remarkable comeback in the first match of 2018 on 26 January, netting a tap-in seconds after missing a penalty in the 95th minute to give Flamurtari a 1–0 home win against Partizani. He then endured a barren run of 15 games without a goal for Flamurtari, ending the streak in the final matchday on 23 May by netting against Kukësi. He finished his second season in Vlorë by playing 30 league match and scoring 8 goals.

On 12 June 2018, after initially announcing his departure following the end of the season, Bušić returned to the club by agreeing a new one-year contract extension worth €5,000 per month.

On 25 January 2019, Bušić terminated the contract by reaching an consensus with club administrator Sinan Idrizi. In an interview, he explained that the reason of his departure was the unpaid wages that club owns him, stating: "It was hard to play without the wages". During his time in Vlorë, Bušić totaled 75 Albanian Superliga appearances, scoring 23 goals. In cup, he made 8 appearances and scored 2 goals, both of them in his first season.

Teuta
On 25 January 2019, on the same day as his departure, Teuta president Edmond Hasanbelliu confirmed that Bušić will continue his career with Djemtë e Detit. He was presented the following day, inking a contract until the end of 2018–19 campaign. He made his official debut on 28 January against his former side Flamurtari, entering as a second-half substitute and scoring a goal which was correctly disawolled, as the match ended in a 1–1 home draw.

Gjilani
In July 2019, Bušić joined SC Gjilani.

International career

Bušić has been a regular and key part of the Croatian national under-21 team.

Career statistics

References

External links
Tomislav Bušić at the Albanian Football Association

1986 births
Living people
Footballers from Split, Croatia
Association football forwards
Croatian footballers
Croatia youth international footballers
Croatia under-21 international footballers
HNK Hajduk Split players
FC Dynamo Kyiv players
Maccabi Petah Tikva F.C. players
NK Slaven Belupo players
Simurq PIK players
KF Vllaznia Shkodër players
KF Tirana players
Terengganu F.C. II players
Flamurtari Vlorë players
KF Teuta Durrës players
SC Gjilani players
Croatian Football League players
Ukrainian Premier League players
Israeli Premier League players
Azerbaijan Premier League players
Kategoria Superiore players
Malaysia Super League players
Malaysia Premier League players
Football Superleague of Kosovo players
Croatian expatriate footballers
Expatriate footballers in Ukraine
Croatian expatriate sportspeople in Ukraine
Expatriate footballers in Israel
Croatian expatriate sportspeople in Israel
Expatriate footballers in Azerbaijan
Croatian expatriate sportspeople in Azerbaijan
Expatriate footballers in Albania
Croatian expatriate sportspeople in Albania
Expatriate footballers in Malaysia
Croatian expatriate sportspeople in Malaysia
Expatriate footballers in Kosovo
Croatian expatriate sportspeople in Kosovo